Renzo Vecchiato (born August 8, 1955 in Trieste) is a former basketball player from Italy, who won the silver medal with his national team at the 1980 Summer Olympics in Moscow.

References

1955 births
Living people
Auxilium Pallacanestro Torino players
Sportspeople from Trieste
Italian men's basketball players
1978 FIBA World Championship players
Olympic basketball players of Italy
Olympic silver medalists for Italy
Basketball players at the 1980 Summer Olympics
Basketball players at the 1984 Summer Olympics
FIBA EuroBasket-winning players
Pallacanestro Virtus Roma players
Olympic medalists in basketball
Medalists at the 1980 Summer Olympics